94.5 Radyo Bandera Sweet FM (DYTJ 94.5 MHz) is an FM station owned by Tagbilaran Broadcasting System and operated by 5K Broadcasting Network, Inc. Its studios and transmitter are located at Brgy. Bachao Sur, Kalibo.

The station was formerly known as Drive FM under GSM Broadcasting Services from July 10, 2019, until September 2022, when 5K Broadcasting took over its operations.

References

External links
Sweet FM Kalibo FB Page
Drive FM Website

Radio stations in Aklan
Radio stations established in 2019